Historic reserves are a type of New Zealand protected area. Most are less than 10 hectares in size, and protect places of places, objects, and natural features of historic, archaeological, cultural or educational value. Land Information New Zealand lists 185 historic reserves on its website.

Northland's historic reserves include Ruapekapeka pā, the site of a significant battle in 1846, and Pompallier House, an early Catholic mission at Russell.

In Auckland, some historic reserves are located on the Hauraki Gulf. One reserve protects the World War II fortifications at Stony Batter on Waiheke Island. Another includes the palatial house and Italian garden of 19th century Governor George Grey, which is maintained by volunteers.

Wellington's historic reserves include the wooden Government Buildings.

In Otago, there are several historic reserves related to the Otago Gold Rush, including St Bathans Post Office and the former diggings at Gabriels Gully.

North Island

Northland Region

 Ahipara Gumfields Historic Reserve
 Akatārere Historic Reserve
 Akatere Historic Reserve
 Akeake Historic Reserve
 Cable Bay Historic Reserve
 Edmonds Ruins Historic Reserve
 Flagstaff Hill Historic Reserve
 Harata Historic Reserve
 Kahuwhera Pa Historic Reserve
 Kaipara North Head Lighthouse Historic Reserve
 Kerikeri Wharf Historic Reserve
 Kohukohu Historic Reserve
 Kororipo Pa Historic Reserve
 Mangonui Court House Historic Reserve
 Marsden Cross Historic Reserve
 Motumaire Historic Reserve
 Muiata Pa Historic Reserve
 Okiato Point Historic Reserve
 Okuratope Pa Historic Reserve
 Pairatahi Gum Historic Reserve
 Pompallier House Historic Reserve
 Rangikapiti Pa Historic Reserve
 Ruapekapeka Historic Reserve
 Tapeka Point Historic Reserve
 Waikare Historic Reserve

Auckland Region

 Fort Takapuna Historic Reserve
 Kawau Island Historic Reserve
 Mahurangi River Historic Reserve
 Matietie Historic Reserve
 Maungauika / North Head Historic Reserve
 North Head Historic Reserve
 Onepoto Historic Reserve
 Pratts Road Historic Reserve
 Smeltinghouse Historic Reserve
 S.S. Wairarapa Graves (Tapuwai Point) Historic Reserve
 St Johns Redoubt Historic Reserve
 Stony Batter Historic Reserve
 Te Maketu Historic Reserve
 Waiau Pa Historic Reserve
 Wiri Historic Reserve

Waikato Region

 Bald Spur Historic Reserve
 Cameron Town Historic Reserve
 Gudex Memorial Park Historic Reserve
 Kakepuku Mountain Historic Reserve
 Meremere Pa Site Historic Reserve
 Opepe Bush Scenic & Historic Reserve
 Opera Point Historic Reserve
 Opito Point Historic Reserve
 Paterangi Historic Reserve
 Puketapu Historic Reserve
 Puraho Historic Reserve
 Rangiriri Pa Historic Reserve
 Sailors Grave Historic Reserve
 School Of Mines Historic Reserve
 Selwyn Park Historic Reserve
 Smith Historic Reserve
 Taniwha Pa Historic Reserve
 Te Pare Point Historic Reserve
 Te Puia Block Historic Reserve
 Te Wheoro's Redoubt Historic Reserve
 Victoria Battery Historic Reserve
 Whangamarino Redoubt Historic Reserve
 Wigmore Historic Reserve

Bay of Plenty Region

 Fort Galatea Historic Reserve
 Gate Pa Historic Reserve
 Gerald Crapp Historic Reserve
 Hine Rae Historic Reserve
 Kauri Point Historic Reserve
 Matekerepu Historic Reserve
 Maungaruahine Pa Historic Reserve
 Paparoa Pa Historic Reserve
 Tokitoki Historic Reserve
 Waiotahe Spit Historic Reserve
 Waiotahi Spit Historic Reserve

Gisborne Region

 Cook Landing Site Historic Reserve
 Puhi Kai Iti / Cook Landing National Historic Reserve
 Te Kuri a Paoa/Young Nick’s Head National Historic Reserve
 Young Nick's Head/Te Kuri a Paoa Historic Reserve

Hawke's Bay Region

 Heipipi Pa Historic Reserve
 Mangaone Caves Historic Reserve
 Mangaone Caves Scenic Reserve
 Otatara Pa Historic Reserve
 Te Heru o Tūreia Historic Reserve
 Tiwaewae Memorial Reserve Historic Reserve
 Whangawehi Coronation Reserve

Taranaki Region

 Awa te Take Pa Historic Reserve
 Kawau Pa Historic Reserve
 Mahoetahi Historic Reserve
 Marsland Hill Historic Reserve
 Omata Stockade Historic Reserve
 Pou Tehia Historic Reserve
 Pukerangiora Pa Historic Reserve
 Puketakauere Pa Historic Reserve
 Puketarata-Parihamore Historic Reserve
 Sentry Hill Redoubt Historic Reserve
 St George's Redoubt Historic Reserve
 Tapuinikau Pa Historic Reserve
 Tataraimaka Pa Historic Reserve
 Tataraimaka / St George’s Redoubt Historic Reserve
 Tataraimaka Urupā Historic Reserve
 Taumata Historic Reserve
 Te Koru Pa Historic Reserve

Manawatū-Whanganu Region

 Moutoa Gardens Historic Reserve
 Tikirere Mill Race Historic Reserve

Wellington Region

 Government Buildings Historic Reserve
 Matiu Historic Reserve
 Shield's Flat Stone Walls Historic Reserve
 Turnbull House Historic Reserve

South Island

Tasman District

 Belgrove Windmill Historic Reserve
 Parapara Peninsula Historic Reserve
 Six Mile Historic Reserve

Nelson District

 Albion Square Historic Reserve

Marlborough District

 Horahora-kakahu Historic Reserve
 Rai Valley Pioneer Cottage
 Ship Cove Historic Reserve

West Coast Region

 Blacks Point Historic Reserve
 Denniston Historic Reserve
 Donovans Store Historic Reserve
 Hatters Terrace Historic Reserve
 Jacks Mill School Kotuku Historic Reserve
 Lyell Historic Reserve
 Mahinapua Creek Rail Bridge Historic Reserve
 Okarito School House Historic Reserve
 Reefton Historic Courthouse Reserve
 Reefton School Of Mines Historic Reserve
 Ross Goldsfields Historic Reserve
 Ross Historic Cemetery Reserve
 Seddon House Historic Reserve
 Te Ana o Matuku Historic Reserve

Canterbury Region

 Britomart Memorial Historic Reserve
 Cairn Of Peace
 Coronation Hill Historic Reserve
 Cotons Cob Cottage Historic Reserve
 Jeanie Collier Grave Site Reserve
 Kakahu Lime Kiln Historic Reserve
 Kapuatohe Historic Reserve
 Monavale Historic Reserve
 Nga Niho Pa Historic Reserve
 Ō Tamakura Historic Reserve
 Raincliff Historic Reserve
 Ripapa Island Historic Reserve
 Te Puke-ki-wiataha
 Transit Of Venus Historic Reserve
 Weka Pass Historic Reserve

Otago Region

 Alexandra Courthouse Historic Reserve
 Arrowtown Chinese Settlement Historic Reserve
 Arrowtown Gaol Historic Reserve
 Atleys Terrace Historic Reserve
 Bannockburn Post Office Historic Reserve
 Bannockburn Sluicings Historic Reserve
 Bendigo Bake House Historic Reserve
 Bendigo Historic Reserve
 Coal Pit Saddle Historic Reserve
 Dead Horse Pinch Historic Reserve
 Earnscleugh Dredge Tailings Historic Reserve
 Gabriel Read Memorial Historic Reserve
 Gabriels Gully Historic Reserve
 Golden Point Historic Reserve
 Horseshoe Bend Cemetery Historic Reserve
 Invincible Mine Historic Reserve
 Katiki Point Historic Reserve
 Kawarau Bridge Historic Reserve
 Kotahitanga Church Historic Reserve
 Macetown Historic Reserve
 Mitchell's Cottage Historic Reserve
 Murphys Flat Historic Reserve
 Nine Mile Historic Reserve
 Onewhenua Historic Reserve
 Pioneer Stream Historic Reserve
 Quartz Reef Point Historic Reserve
 Queenstown Astronomical Historic Reserve
 Shek Harn Historic Reserve
 Sir John McKenzie Memorial Historic Reserve
 St Bathans Hall Historic Reserve
 St Bathans Post Office Historic Reserve
 Te-U-Mukuri Historic Reserve
 Town of Nenthorn Historic Reserve
 Young Australian Historic Reserve

Southland Region

 Muddy Gully Historic Reserve
 Sand Hill Point Historic Reserve
 Tākerehaka Historic Reserve

References

Protected areas of New Zealand
Lists of tourist attractions in New Zealand
New Zealand environment-related lists